Zeynep's Eight Days is a 2007 Turkish drama film, written and directed by Cemal Şan, starring Fadik Sevin Atasoy as an isolated woman searching for a stranger she fell in love with at a party. It is the first part of a trilogy of films which includes Dilber's Eight Days (2008) and Ali's Eight Days (2009).

External links
 

2000s Turkish-language films
2007 drama films
2007 films
Films set in Turkey
Turkish drama films